Implicit animation is a concept in user interface design in which animations can be programmed or styled within pre-existing constraints. It is distinct from explicit animation, which involves building the animation objects, setting their properties, and then applying those animation objects to the object which the designer wishes animated.

Examples of use
 Apple Inc.'s Core Animation API
 CSS Transitions and Transforms in WebKit

External links 
 Apple's Core Animation Programming Guide (Accessed 2017-08-01)

User interfaces
Cascading Style Sheets
Declarative programming